Bade Achhe Lagte Hain is an Indian television drama series that premiered on May 30, 2011 on Sony TV and is produced by Shobha Kapoor and Ekta Kapoor under their banner Balaji Telefilms. The show stars  Ram Kapoor and Sakshi Tanwar as protagonists.

The show won the Kalakar Award for the Best Serial.  In addition, the show has won six Indian Television Academy Awards, three Star Guild Awards, five Indian Telly Awards, three FICCI Frames Excellence Honours and two People's Choice Awards,

BIG Star Entertainment Awards
The BIG Star Entertainment Awards are presented annually by Reliance Broadcast Network Limited in association with STAR India to honour personalities from the field of entertainment across movies, music, television, sports, theater and dance.

Kalakar Awards

The Kalakar Awards are given by  Bengali Federation of India.

Indian Television Academy Awards
The Indian Television Academy Awards, also known as the ITA Awards is an annual event organised by the Indian Television Academy. The awards are presented in various categories, including popular programming(music, news, entertainment, sports, travel, lifestyle and fashion), best television channel in various categories, technical awards and Best Performance awards.

Indian Telly Awards
The Indian Telly Awards are annual honours presented by the PR firm Indian Television. The Awards are given in several categories such as best program or series in a specific genre, best television channel in a particular category, most popular actors and awards for technical roles such as writers and directors.

Lions Gold Awards
The Lions Gold Awards are presented by Lions Club of Mumbai.

People's Choice Awards
The People's Choice Awards India are honours presented excellence in the television industry, Bollywood, music and sports. The awards are given in several other categories also.

Star Guild Awards
The Star Guild Awards (Also known as Apsara Film & Television Producer's Guild Awards) are presented annually by members of the Apsara Producers Guild to honour excellence in film and television.

References

External links
 

Bade Achhe Lagte Hain